Robert Smith Cunis (5 January 1941 – 9 August 2008) played 20 Test matches for New Zealand as a pace bowler between 1964 and 1972, and was later coach of the New Zealand national team from 1987 to 1990.  His son Stephen played cricket for Canterbury between 1998 and 2006.

A sturdily-built fast-medium bowler, Bob Cunis played for Auckland from 1960–61 to 1973–74, and for Northern Districts in 1975–76 and 1976–77.

Cricket career

1960s
On his first-class debut in December 1960, Cunis took 6 for 72 and 2 for 26 against Northern Districts to help Auckland to an eight-wicket victory. In 1961–62 he took 27 wickets at 14.18, including 2 for 31 and 7 for 29 in the victory over Central Districts. In the first match of the 1963–64 season he took 6 for 44 and 7 for 41 in a one-wicket victory over Canterbury.

He played his first Test against the visiting South Africans at the end of the 1963–64 season, taking two wickets (Graeme Pollock and Denis Lindsay) in a drawn match.

He had a moderate season in 1964–65 and was not selected for any of the home Tests against Pakistan or the tour that followed. In 1965–66 he took 22 wickets at 17.45 in the Plunket Shield and played in all three Tests against England, taking seven wickets at 35.43 off 121.5 overs. In the First Test, when New Zealand were 32 for 8 in the second innings, "Cunis, a well-built Rugby centre-threequarter, saved the day by defending successfully through the last thirty-five minutes" in a partnership with Vic Pollard. His 16 not out was the top score.

In the first match of the 1966–67 season Cunis took 7 for 30 against Northern Districts. In his most successful batting season he made 293 runs at 41.85 in the Plunket Shield, including two 50s and the only first-class century of his career, 111, batting at number eight against Otago. He also took 19 wickets at 20.21, and played for New Zealand in three of the matches against the visiting Australian side, but with little success.

In 1968–69 he took 30 wickets at 12.60 to help Auckland to the Plunket Shield. Once again he shone in the season's opening match, taking 6 for 39 and 4 for 54 in an innings victory over Northern Districts. He played in the three Tests against the visiting West Indies side later that season, taking 2 for 76 and 3 for 36 in New Zealand's victory in the Second Test.

He toured England in 1969. His early form was unimpressive, but after taking 6 for 54 against Sussex he was selected for the Third Test and took 3 for 49 and 2 for 36. He played all three Tests against India later that year, taking nine wickets at 17.55, then two Tests against Pakistan for six wickets at 23.50. In the Third Test at Dacca, coming in at 101 for 8 in the second innings with New Zealand leading by only 84, he batted for more than two hours with Mark Burgess, scoring 23 in a partnership of 96 that put the match out of Pakistan's reach and gave New Zealand their first ever series victory.

1970s
Cunis's jaw was broken while batting for New Zealand against Western Australia in Perth in the Australasian one-day competition in January 1971, but he played in the two Tests against England that began a few weeks later. The Second Test in Auckland was his most successful Test, when his "persistent length and sharp out-swing provided a consistent challenge to the batsmen" and he took 6 for 76 and 3 for 52.

He was selected to play in the World XI that toured Australia in 1971–72, but had little success. In the tour to the West Indies that followed, he took only six wickets in the five Tests at an average of 102.83. He did, however, hit his highest Test score, 51, in the Second Test, adding 136 for the eighth wicket with Bevan Congdon in 190 minutes. After that series he lost his place in the Test team to the younger fast bowlers Richard Collinge, Dayle Hadlee and Richard Hadlee, although he continued to play domestic cricket in New Zealand until 1976–77.

He worked as a school teacher.

Assessments
Dick Brittenden wrote that Cunis's cricket career was plagued by knee injury that affected his bowling. "His inability to move really freely gave him in his run-up the lurching gait of a drunken sailor; and [he] seemed to bowl from the wrong foot, to add to his enchantment."

Test Match Special commentator Alan Gibson once commented, "This is Cunis at the Vauxhall End. Cunis, a funny sort of name: neither one thing nor the other." However, according to his Wisden obituary, the witticism was probably first coined by Alan Ross in a report in The Observer of the New Zealanders' match against Sussex in 1969.

References

External links
 Former NZ cricketer Bob Cunis dies suddenly
 

1941 births
2008 deaths
New Zealand cricketers
New Zealand Test cricketers
New Zealand cricket coaches
Auckland cricketers
Northern Districts cricketers
Cricketers from Whangārei
North Island cricketers